Peraglyphis is a genus of moths belonging to the subfamily Tortricinae of the family Tortricidae.

Species
Peraglyphis aderces Common, 1963
Peraglyphis anaptis (Meyrick, 1910)
Peraglyphis aphanta Common, 1963
Peraglyphis atherista Common, 1963
Peraglyphis atimana (Meyrick, 1881)
Peraglyphis chalepa Common, 1963
Peraglyphis confusana (Walker, 1863)
Peraglyphis crustata (Meyrick, 1912)
Peraglyphis dyscheres Common, 1963
Peraglyphis epixantha Common, 1963
Peraglyphis eucrines Common, 1963
Peraglyphis hemerana (Meyrick, 1882)
Peraglyphis idiogenes Common, 1963
Peraglyphis lividana (Meyrick, 1881)
Peraglyphis scepasta Common, 1963
Peraglyphis silvana Razowski, 2012

See also
List of Tortricidae genera

References

 , 2005: World catalogue of insects volume 5 Tortricidae.
 , 2012: Five tortricines from Malaysia and New Caledonia (Lepidoptera: Tortricidae). Polish Journal of Entomology 81 (1): 81–90. Full article: .

External links
tortricidae.com

 
Tortricinae
Tortricidae genera